Yann Cucherat (born 2 October 1979) is a French gymnast. He won a bronze medal in parallel bars at the 2005 World Artistic Gymnastics Championships. He competed at the 2000, 2004, 2008, and 2012 Summer Olympics.

References

External links

1979 births
Living people
French male artistic gymnasts
Medalists at the World Artistic Gymnastics Championships
Olympic gymnasts of France
Gymnasts at the 2000 Summer Olympics
Gymnasts at the 2004 Summer Olympics
Gymnasts at the 2008 Summer Olympics
Gymnasts at the 2012 Summer Olympics
European champions in gymnastics
21st-century French people